Lesbian, gay, bisexual, and transgender (LGBT) people in the Syrian Arab Republic face legal challenges not experienced by non-LGBT residents. Article 520 of the penal code of 1949, prohibits "carnal relations against the order of nature", and provides for up to three years' imprisonment.

Vigilante executions, beatings, torture, and vigilante attacks against LGBT happen all the time in Syria, including attacks by the rebel group  Hayat Tahrir al-Sham.

Mahmoud Hassino, a gay Syrian opposition activist and journalist who started the online magazine Mawaleh, notes that regardless of the outcome of the civil war, work needs to be done in the area of civil rights on behalf of all Syrians, not just the LGBT community. Miral Bioredda, a secular leader of the Local Coordination Committees of Syria, said "Personally I see homosexuality as a private matter. But Syrian society would say "no way" if gays rose to claim their rights. Developing a civil society will take time." Nasradeen Ahme, a member of the Free Syrian Army which works to bring down the government of Bashar al-Assad, said "If I was in charge I would enforce tougher laws against homosexuals. If someone said homosexuals should be stoned to death as in Iran and Saudi Arabia, I would not object."

On 14 September 2021, an organization called Guardians of Equality Movement-(GEM) was launched, led by LGBTQIA+ activists and victims / survivors. This organization works to defend and protect the rights of the Syrian LGBTQIA+ community. It is considered the first official Syrian LGBTQIA+ organization which is focusing entirely in the Syrian LGBTQIA+.

The unknown founder of the GEM-organization started this initiative since he was living in northwestern Syria, Idlib, under the control of the most dangerous extremist factions.

The government and the opposition typically being unaccepting of homosexuality often leaves LGBTQ+ Syrians confused as to which side to stand by and thus prevents them from participating in the future political decision of their homeland.

LGBT history in Syria

2010: Political interference 
In 2010, the Syrian police began a crackdown that led to the arrest of over 25 men. The men were charged with various crimes ranging from homosexual acts and illegal drug use, to encouraging homosexual behavior and organizing obscene parties.

2011: Social movements and virtual organising 
After 2011, the LGBT community in Syria started to demand rights more openly, and campaigns outside of Syria started to spread awareness about LGBT rights. That was greatly affected by the expanding number of Syrian immigrants and refugees who found more opportunities to speak out.

Many LGBT Syrian refugees participated in gay pride parades around the world.

On 14 September 2021,the first Syrian LGBTQIA+  organization called Guardians of Equality Movement-(GEM) was launched, led by LGBTQIA+ activists and victims / survivors

2015: International concerns 
In August 2015, the UN Security Council met in a session on LGBT rights co-sponsored by the U.S. and Chile. The council heard testimony from refugees fleeing Syria and Iraq. In ISIS-held areas, the refugees reported increased violence against women and members of the LGBT community. They reported that ISIS had claimed to have executed at least 30 people for "sodomy". This was the first time in its 70-year history that the UN Security Council had discussed LGBT concerns.

2021 
On 14 September 2021, an organization called Guardians of Equality Movement-(GEM) was launched, led by LGBTQIA+ activists and victims / survivors this organization works to defend and protect the rights of the Syrian LGBTQIA+ community, as a big challenge the unknown founder of the  Guardians of Equality Movement-(GEM) has started this initiative since he was living in northwestern Syria, Idlib, under the control of the most dangerous extremist factions

LGBT life in Syria

Culture 
In 1971, Syrian poet Nizar Qabbani wrote "The Evil Poem", in which he described a sexual relationship between two women.

Before 2011, a gay tour was organized by Bertho. It was the first and the only gay tour in the middle east, choosing Damascus and Aleppo as one of their main destinations in the middle east. "And it was the best destination ever", he says. "We’d go on tours of the hammams in Aleppo, and in Damascus it was a paradise for gay people. We never had any problems, never ever".

They tour passed by Lebanon, Syria, and Jordan. Since the beginning of the civil war, the tour stopped its activities in Syria due to the increase of terrorism caused by Islamic extremists.

Furthermore, areas of Damascus that were previously underground hubs where LGBT would meet, and were practically the only places in Syria where an underground LGBT scene could even exist, have been eradicated since the Civil War began and most cultural pursuits have stopped.

LGBT movies and series

On 19 October 2017, Mr. Gay Syria was released. Written and directed by Ayse Toprak, the movie follows two gay Syrian refugees who are trying to rebuild their lives.

A Lesbian Tale, a short movie, was filmed in Syria. It was published by Maxim Diab on 16 January 2014.

Social 
With the development of modernization, society were moving forward to being nuclear families and social tolerance toward LGBT people were gradually declining, until the outbreak of the Syrian civil war in 2011. Due to the emergence of the war, society has become more tolerant of LGBT people. Safety, water, and food are their primary concerns, income, and education followed with the necessity.

HIV/AIDS issues 

The first reported cases of HIV infection were in 1987.

In 2005, the Deputy Minister of Religious Endowments publicly stated that HIV/AIDS was divine punishment for people who engaged in fornication and homosexuality. That same year, the Health Ministry stated that only 369 people in Syria were infected with HIV and that the government offers such people "up-to-date medicines to combat this disease freely". Non-governmental organizations estimate that there are truly at least five times that many, and the United Nations chastised the government for its ineffective prevention methods.

Beyond tolerating the work of some NGOs, the government has established voluntary clinics that can test for HIV/AIDS and distribute some educational pamphlets, but comprehensive public education, especially for LGBT people, does not exist.

Instead, the government launched a limited HIV/AIDS educational program for youth in secondary schooling. The country is considered to have one of the lowest prevalences of HIV infection in the Region, with less than 2 per 100,000 among the general population affected and less than 1% among the most at-risk populations in 2018. The total number of total reported HIV cases until the end of the third quarter of 2019 was 1013.

Political support 

As part of the Rights in Exile Programme, the International Refugee Rights Initiative has compiled a resource page for LGBTI citizens of the Syrian Arab Republic.

Abdulrahman Akkad Story 

In July 2017, a Syrian young man residing in Germany named Abdulrahman Akkad published a live Video on Facebook, in which he announced his sexual orientation and that his family was pressuring him to marry against his will. Akkad's story was mentioned in the human rights session in the German Parliament in 2020 by German philosopher David Berger.

One of you (2020) 
"One of you", or in Arabic "واحد منكن" (pron: wahed menkon), is a social media movement that started on Facebook at first in 2020, then moved to Twitter for easier recognition. It launched around March in Syria, then followed by the Arab community. Continued for a month afterwards, but due to recent events at that time, mostly being about the COVID-19 pandemic, the trend died.

It started with university students painting the LGBT flag colors on their fingers, with the hashtag #oneofyou on their hand, taking a picture with a faculty building while raising the hand, and posting it from various accounts. Most people who started the trend did not post from their personal social media accounts out of fear of being recognized, instead; they sent the picture to various pages from fake accounts to publish on their behalf.

Reactions varied, from people defending the trend, to others promising blood, to people who participated afterwards.

No incidents happened while the trend was ongoing, no casualties, just online discussions. Some escalated into heated arguments, but nothing happened as the trend died.

In the Diaspora 
Syrian LGBTQ+ refugees; among other ones from different nationalities are facing discrimination and exclusion in the hosting countries based on other factors such as race, language, skin color and religious background.

Summary table

See also 

:Category:Syrian LGBT rights activists
Human rights in Syria
LGBT rights in Asia
LGBT in the Middle East
Abdulrahman Akkad

References

Further reading

LGBT in Syria
Human rights in Syria
Law of Syria
Syria